François-Xavier Gillot (12 September 1842, Autun – 8 October 1910, Autun) was a French physician, mycologist and botanist.

Gillot was a founding member of the Société d'histoire naturelle d'Autun, and from 1877 was a non-resident member of the Société botanique de Lyon. The fungal genus Gillotia was named in his honor in 1913 by Pier Andrea Saccardo and Alessandro Trotter.

Selected works 
 Note sur la flore du plateau d'Antully, 1878 - Note on the flora from the plateau of Antully.
 Notice sur la flore de St. Honoré-les-Bains (Nièvre), 1883 - Notice on the flora of St. Honoré-les-Bains (Nièvre).
 Catalogue raisonné des champignons supérieurs (Hyménomycètes) des environs d'Autun et du département de Saône-et-Loire (with Jean Louis Lucand), 1891 - Catalogue raisonné of superior mushrooms (Hymenomycetes) found in the environs of Autun and the department of Saône-et-Loire.  
 Contribution à l'étude des orchidées, 1898 - Contribution to the study of orchids.

References

External links 
 IPNI List of plants described and co-described by Gillot.

1842 births
1910 deaths
People from Autun
19th-century French botanists
French mycologists
20th-century French botanists